Dwarf is an unincorporated community located in Perry County, Kentucky, United States. The town was named after Jeremiah Combs, whose nickname of "Short Jerry" pointed to his diminutive size.

Its post office is still active (see image)

See also

References

External links

Unincorporated communities in Perry County, Kentucky
Unincorporated communities in Kentucky